Veratrum lobelianum is a species of flowering plant belonging to the family Melanthiaceae.

Its native range is Central Europe to Caucasus and Russian Far East. The plant is highly poisonous.

References

lobelianum